Haines House may refer to:

Places and structures

United States
(by state, then city)

 Alfred Haines House, San Diego, California, listed on the National Register of Historic Places (NRHP) in San Diego County, California
 Elizabeth Haines House, Sebring, Florida, NRHP-listed
 John Haines House, Boise, Idaho, listed on the NRHP in Ada County, Idaho
 Haines House Museum, Waukegan, Illinois, a museum in Illinois
 Benjamin Haines House, Montgomery, New York, NRHP-listed, also called Haines Farmstead
 Jonathan Haines House, Medford, New Jersey, listed on the NRHP in Burlington County, New Jersey
Haines House (Alliance, Ohio), NRHP-listed, an 'underground railroad' station
 Frank Haines House, Sabina, Ohio, listed on the NRHP in Clinton County, Ohio
 Hanson Haines House, Philadelphia, Pennsylvania, NRHP-listed
 Wyck House, also called Haines House, Philadelphia, Pennsylvania, NRHP-listed

See also
 Haynes House (disambiguation)
 Haines House Haulage v Gamble